Efim Motpan (Efim Moțpan; born 10 February 1971) is a Moldovan racewalker. He competed in the men's 20 kilometres walk at the 2000 Summer Olympics.

References

1971 births
Living people
Athletes (track and field) at the 2000 Summer Olympics
Moldovan male racewalkers
Olympic athletes of Moldova
People from Ungheni District